The Baton Rouge Open Invitational, first played as The Baton Rouge Open, was a PGA Tour event that was played in Baton Rouge, Louisiana in the 1950s and early 1960s. It was played at the Baton Rouge Country Club every year except 1961 when the event was played at Sherwood Forest Country Club. The Baton Rouge Country Club's par-72, 18-hole "Baton Rouge" course was designed by Joseph S. Finger and opened in 1916.

Winners

References

Former PGA Tour events
Golf in Louisiana
Sports competitions in Baton Rouge, Louisiana
Recurring sporting events established in 1952
Recurring sporting events disestablished in 1962
1952 establishments in Louisiana
1962 disestablishments in Louisiana